DXSI (105.3 FM), broadcasting as 105.3 Radyo Natin, is a radio station owned and operated by Manila Broadcasting Company. The studio is located in Martinez Subd., Mati, Davao Oriental.

References

Radio stations established in 1997
Radio stations in Davao Oriental